Kükürtlü can refer to:

 Kükürtlü, Aşkale
 Kükürtlü, Horasan